The Embassy of Morocco in Washington, D.C. is the Kingdom of Morocco's diplomatic mission to the United States. The embassy is located at 3508 International Drive NW in the North Cleveland Park neighborhood, and the Consular Section is located at 1601 21st Street NW in the Dupont Circle neighborhood.

The embassy operates a Consulate-General in New York City.

The current ambassador is Princess Lalla Joumala Alaoui.

References

External links

Morocco
Washington, D.C.
Morocco–United States relations
North Cleveland Park